They All Play Ragtime was a Canadian historical documentary television miniseries which aired on CBC Television in 1981.

Production
This series documented the history of ragtime music and its performers such as

Eubie Blake, Max Morath, Dick Wellstood, Milton Kaye and Dick Hyman

Performances from the Canadian Brass and the Nexus percussion group were included during the series.

Scheduling
This half-hour series was broadcast on Sundays at 10:00 p.m. (Eastern) from 3 May to 7 June 1981.

References

External links
 

CBC Television original programming
1981 Canadian television series debuts
1981 Canadian television series endings
1980s Canadian documentary television series
1980s Canadian music television series